The Vechte (in German and in Low Saxon (Dutch Low Saxon pronunciation: [v̯ɛxtə]) or Vecht (in Dutch), often called Overijsselse Vecht in the Netherlands to avoid confusion with its Utrecht counterpart, is a river in Germany and the Netherlands.

The Vechte originates in Oberdarfeld in the German state of North Rhine-Westphalia near the city of Coesfeld and flows north into the state of Lower Saxony, past the towns of Nordhorn and Emlichheim, across the border and then westwards into the Dutch province of Overijssel (hence its alternate Dutch designation). There, it flows through the north part of the Salland region past Hardenberg and Ommen, taking in the water of the Regge stream along the way.

Close to the city of Zwolle, the river suddenly bends north to end in confluence with the Zwarte Water river near the town of Hasselt.

The Vechte is probably the Vidrus mentioned by Ptolemy in his map of Magna Germania.

See also
List of rivers of the Netherlands
List of rivers of Lower Saxony
List of rivers of North Rhine-Westphalia

References

Tributaries of the IJsselmeer
Rivers of Lower Saxony
Rivers of North Rhine-Westphalia
Münster (region)
Salland
Rivers of Overijssel
Rivers of the Netherlands
Rivers of Germany
International rivers of Europe